The ASH 30 is a two-seater Open Class glider manufactured by Alexander Schleicher, developed as a replacement for the ASH 25. The Mi version is powered by a  Wankel engine. The prototype made its maiden flight on 7 April 2011 from Wasserkuppe.

Design and development
The improvements over the ASH 25 are given as:
 a larger span
 new wing sections with a coefficient of lift that is about 0.2 higher
 a maximum take-off weight of 850 kg for the Mi version
 automatic control surface connections for the entire aircraft
 enlarged cockpits 
 larger canopies to improve visibility and to allow easier entry and exit for the rear pilot

Variants
ASH 30The un-powered prototype glider.
ASH 30 Mi The motor-glider production aircraft, capable of self launching with a retractable engine and propeller.

Specifications (ASH 30 Mi)

See also

Notes

References

External links

Schleicher website

2010s German sailplanes
Schleicher aircraft
Motor gliders
T-tail aircraft
Mid-wing aircraft
Aircraft first flown in 2011